The Bongolo Dam is a dam on the Louetsi River in southwestern Gabon, near Bongolo. The dam was built in the early 1990s with Canadian investment.

References

Ngounié Province
Dams in Gabon